Henry Crathorne (_-6 December 1797) was a member of the Royal Society.

His membership was proposed in 1774 by Lord Leeds, Lord Chesterfield, Lord Leicester, Alexander Aubert and Lord Greville; and he was promptly elected.

References

Fellows of the Royal Society
1797 deaths
Year of birth unknown